Holly Cairns (born 4 November 1989), also known as Holly McKeever Cairns, is an Irish Social Democrats politician who has been Leader of the Social Democrats since March 2023. She has been a Teachta Dála (TD) for Cork South-West since the 2020 general election. She was a member of Cork County Council for the Bantry local electoral area from 2019 to 2020.

Early life 
Born on a farm in West Cork, Cairns is a farmer working in the family business, Brown Envelope Seeds, producing organic seeds. She has a first class honours MSc in Organic Horticulture from University College Cork. Her mother, Madeline McKeever, contested the 2004 Skibbereen Town Council election as a Green Party candidate. Madeline McKeever, noted as an environmental activist in West Cork: The People and the Place, was arrested in 2003 alongside Quentin Gargan for selling home produce on the street in Skibbereen. A subsequent court case found that their market stalls were legal, to the benefit of other would-be market traders. Cairns attended Lisheen National School and lives in Turk Head, Aughadown.

Early political career 
Cairns first entered politics as an activist interested in LGBT rights, canvassing on behalf of David Norris during the 2011 Irish presidential election. Following a period living abroad in Malta, Cairns returned to Ireland and joined the Together for Yes campaign during the referendum on repealing the 8th amendment, the amendment which forbade abortion in Ireland in almost all circumstances. Cairn's experience during this time prompted her to join the Social Democrats in 2018. She was one of the founding members of the West Cork branch of the party.

Cork County Council (2019–2020) 
Cairns was elected to Cork County Council for the Bantry–West Cork local electoral area in the 2019 local elections, winning the last seat by a single vote, after several rechecks and a recount. Cairns ran on a platform opposing the establishment of a plastics factory in Skibbereen. RTP, the company proposing the factory later withdrew their planning application. After the application was withdrawn, Cairns said that "It also highlights the fact that councillors need to look carefully at rezoning and local area plans to make sure they are in line with government policy on climate change. We can’t keep flying the green flag and shy away from taking real climate action decisions. She received publicity as a result of four of her posters disappearing in the Durrus area after the first official day of postering. Cairns was offered a year as Mayor by Fine Gael in return for support, which she turned down. She stood for Chair of the Municipal District of West Cork, but was beaten by Cllr. Joe Carroll by 5 votes to 4.

She produces the "Inside the Chamber" podcast about local government. Cairns campaigns for greater transparency in local government. In late 2019, she raised a motion to ensure that representatives should receive documents three days before having to vote on them. The motion was passed by 53 out of 54 councillors.She revealed how the head of the local authority, Tim Lucey, told her that staff were upset by what she suggested in her motion. During an episode of "Inside the Chamber", she said that he told her staff felt the nature of the motion on her Facebook page ‘was derogatory.’ Defending herself, she said she had just explained her experience ‘honestly and truthfully.’ Describing the Council staff as ‘amazing’, she said: ‘I wasn’t insinuating that anyone was doing a shabby job. I was just saying how it is and I’ll continue to do that. I was very surprised to be told that it was derogatory to do my job.’ She said that getting hefty documents and reports before a meeting started impeded her from doing her job properly and said "When my motion was passed, the chief executive referred it to the Corporate Policy Group to iron out the details. But I found out last week that behind closed doors, the Corporate Policy Group (which includes eight councillors –  all of whom supported my motion in the Chamber) decided that receiving the documents at 9am before an 11am meeting was absolutely fine. This is outrageous. I can’t believe it happened. I will not stand for it. I refuse to be a rubber stamp for Cork County Council." She was publicly supported by Social Democrats co-leader, Catherine Murphy TD. Following her election to the Dáil in 2020, Ross O'Connell, a 29 year old Goleen based PhD student and environmental scientist, was co-opted onto Cork County Council in her place. Cairns was a member of the executive committee of Carbery Housing Association until her election to the Dail.

National politics

TD (2020–present) 
Cairns contested the 2020 general election as a candidate in the Cork South West constituency. She was listed by The Irish Mirror as the youngest Social Democrats candidate, being 30 years old. Cairns was described by the Irish Times during the election campaign as being from Turkhead, west of Skibbereen. She received recognition from The Guardian, as she was running against her then boyfriend, Christopher O'Sullivan of Fianna Fáil, stating 'I feel a bit like I'm in a badly written rom-com'. She was elected, taking the third and final seat, receiving 4,696 (10.59%) first preference votes, the fifth highest amount overall. Heading into the eighth count, Cairns was 2,078 votes behind Fine Gael Senator Tim Lombard, but Cllr Paul Hayes of Sinn Féin saw 3,023 of his transfers go to her and 393 to Lombard, before being deemed elected with 10,078 votes. Cairns was the only female TD elected in all of Cork City and county. Cairns is the Social Democrat Spokesperson for Agriculture, Food and the Marine; Further and Higher Education; and Disability.

In March 2020, the ICMSA hit out at Cairns' "airy-fairy criticism" of dairy export sectors. Eileen Calnan, Chairperson of the West Cork ICMSA, said that she was "somewhat taken aback" by what she called Deputy Cairn's "lukewarm and half-hearted" support of the local dairy sector in an interview on RTÉ Radio 1's "Countrywide". Cairns replied that as farmers, herself and Ms Calnan had more in common than they had to differ on. "I'm glad that we can agree on the most important thing of all: that farmers must be paid a fair price for their product. What I don't agree with is the notion that it's 'airy-fairy' to acknowledge that there are many aspects of the way we do things right now that are not sustainable. It's unreasonable to think the sector isn't vulnerable and doesn't need more robust support in the face of climate change... before this election, Ms Calnan said farmers didn't want politicians who just told them what they thought they wanted to hear. I am delighted to be able to say that that is a promise I will always be able to keep." Also in March, speaking on the fishing industry, Cairns called on Minister Michael Creed to set up a task force involving all stakeholders, from those fishing to the processors and retailers.

In April 2021 Cairns advocated to the Minister with responsibility for mental health Mary Butler on behalf of a constituent who feared she would die unless she could receive in-patient treatment for her anorexia and bulimia. Cairns said she was "begging" the Minister to personally intervene in the matter. Cairns noted that she had previously discovered through parliamentary questions that no funding was allocated under the National Eating Disorder Plan for the year 2020 and that none of the €1.6 million allocated for 2019 was spent at all. Cairns called on the government to remedy this, while her Social Democrats colleague Gary Gannon tabled a motion to ensure that funds already allocated for treating eating disorders are ring-fenced for that purpose and not siphoned off to other areas.

In May 2021 Cairns questioned the Taoiseach Micheál Martin after he publicly encouraged An Taisce to withdraw an appeal against the construction of a €140 million cheese factory in Co Kilkenny. Cairns suggested that the factory would be a means for the Dutch to keep profiting from dairy products while cutting their herd numbers to met environmental standards, using Ireland as a proxy; "I presume you're aware Glanbia is in partnership with a Dutch company. And in the past few years, Holland has reduced its herd by 190,000, while we have increased ours by half a million. It seems Holland has actively found a country with low environmental standards and low milk prices. You have framed this development of profits going abroad as a positive step for Irish agriculture. [Irish] Farmers deserve more respect". Cairns also pointed out that in a previous exchange in the Dáil, Martin had told Cairns it was inappropriate for Government members to intervene in planning issues when she suggested a development on the site of the mother and baby home at Bessborough, Co Cork. Martin responded to Cairns that "politicians every day of the week write to planning authorities. They are entitled to make observations. That’s a fact."

Mother and Baby Homes legislation 
In October 2020, Cairns criticised the Commission of Investigation (Mother and Baby Homes and certain related Matters) Records, and another Matter, Bill 2020 proposed by the government. The bill was criticised for not facilitating access by survivors of the institutions to their personal data and maintaining the thirty-year seal of records from the commission's investigations. Cairns raised the issues with the sealing of the archive in the Dáil. She was especially critical of the Government's unwillingness to take on any of the amendments from the oppositions, especially as the Minister had not engaged with the Collaborative Forum for Survivors.  After the Dáil voted in favour of the legislation, she commented that "I am sick to my stomach that the State has let the survivors down yet again … The amount of emails, phone calls, and letters I have had on the Mother and Baby Homes Records is overwhelming. People want justice and accountability for the survivors of these horrific institutions." After the bill was enacted, she received a commitment from the Taoiseach, Micheál Martin, that survivors would be able to get access to their records.

Greyhound debate 
In November 2020, Cairns opposed a parliamentary motion to allocate state funding to the greyhound racing industry. Wayne McCarthy, a board member of Greyhound Racing Ireland, referred to her as an "ignorant little girl" on Twitter. His Twitter post was then 'liked' by Joe Carey, who later apologised to Cairns, saying he was wrong to like the tweet. Minister for Agriculture, Food and the Marine, Charlie McConalogue, described McCarthy's remarks as "sexist and offensive" and "not acceptable".  Speaking in the Dáil, Cairns said that she didn't want to use her Dáil speaking time to address what she called "this everyday sexism", but that it cannot be ignored, and she invited McCarthy to a public debate in relation to funding the greyhound racing industry. Despite Cairns' lobbying, in 2021 Fianna Fáil Minister for Agriculture Charlie McConalogue committed €19.2 million in taxpayer money to funding greyhound racing.

Leader of the Social Democrats (2023–present)
Cairns announced on 26 February 2023, that she would run for leader of Social Democrats. Nominations were due to close on 1 March, but none of the other TDs within the party chose to run in the election and as result Cairns was announced as the new leader. Cairns took over leadership of the Social Democrats on 1 March 2023. On becoming leader, Cairns reiterated that the Social Democrats have no interest in merging with the Labour party, and that housing and Sláintecare would be red line issues for the Social Democrats in any coalition talks with any party.

The first poll taken after Holly Cairns was elected leader showed that the party's support had more than doubled to 9%

Harassment
In January 2023 Cairns disclosed to the public that in 2022, during a six-month period, she received harassment from an online stalker that eventually escalated to the stalker showing up at her home in West Cork on multiple occasions. Cairns made the disclosure after a number of other Irish women in politics such as Jennifer Carroll MacNeill noted that they had been harassed for being women in the public eye, including being stalked in person as well.

Personal life
Cairns was previously in a relationship with fellow Cork TD Christopher O'Sullivan of Fianna Fáil. However, the relationship ended in 2020; Cairns cited pressure from social media for Cairns and O'Sullivan to answer for each other's political decisions as having negatively impacted upon them.

References

External links
Social Democrats profile

1989 births
Living people
Alumni of University College Cork
Irish farmers
Irish podcasters
Irish women podcasters
Local councillors in County Cork
Members of the 33rd Dáil
Politicians from County Cork
Social Democrats (Ireland) TDs
21st-century women Teachtaí Dála